Sam460ex is a line of modular motherboards produced by the Italian company ACube Systems Srl. The machine was released in October 2010 and can run AmigaOS 4, MorphOS, or Debian GNU/Linux (indeed only CRUX PPC Linux is available because there is neither a Debian official support nor a Debian install ISO).

The Sam460ex made its debut at the Vintage Computer Festival at Bletchley Park in the UK on 19 June 2010, where it was demonstrated to the public running AmigaOS 4.1 along with the Timberwolf web browser, a port of the Mozilla Firefox for the AmigaOS 4. Its hardware features were also showcased, with its SIM card slot and aerial, its ability to boot AmigaOS from SD card. In September 2011, Acube Systems introduced AmigaOne 500 based on Sam460ex mainboard.

Versions

Sam460ex
 FlexATX form factor (21.6 × 17 cm)
 AMCC 460ex SoC – passively cooled PowerPC 440 core up to 1.15 GHz and including a double precision floating point unit (FPU) 
 Cache L1/L2: 32KB/256KB
 max 2 GB DDR2 SDRAM – 200-pin SODIMM up to 533 MHz
 Silicon Motion SM502 embedded MoC (audio/video) max 64MB video memory
 Audio 5.1 Realtek ALC655 codec
 PCI-express 4× lanes slot (v1.1, 16× mechanical connector)
 PCI-express 1× lane slot (mutually exclusive with the SATA2 port)
 PCI slot, 32 bit, 66/33 MHz, 3.3V
 1× SATA2 port (mutually exclusive with the PCI-e 1× slot)
 6× USB2 EHCI/OHCI ports
 2× 10/100/1000 Ethernet ports
 SD card reader
 Serial port

The SATA2 port and the PCI-e 1× slot are mutually exclusive, only one of them can be used at a time.

Sam460ex Lite
The specifications are the same as for the Sam460ex, except for:

 AMCC 460ex SoC clocked at 1 GHz
 Cache L1/L2: 32KB/256KB
 512 MB DDR2 RAM

Sam460cr
The specifications are the same as for the Sam460ex, except for:
Absence of

 Silicon Motion SM502 embedded MoC
 Audio 5.1 Realtek ALC655 codec
 Mutually exclusive 1× SATA2 port

Users are expected to use graphics, sound and Sata interface cards with this model.

Reception
Amiga Power magazine saw PCIe expansion for modern graphics cards, silent fan-less CPU operation, plenty of RAM and USB 2.0 as main advantages of the new Sam460ex board. However, the same review mentioned among weak points CPU speed, problems with audio on some motherboards and lack of 3D drivers for Radeon HD cards under AmigaOS. Reviewing AmigaOne 500, Amiga Future magazine highlighted supplied 2 GB RAM and overall system performance comparable to older Pegasos II computer, but criticized weak built in graphics chip recommending customers to buy dedicated graphics card.

See also

 Sam440ep
 AmigaOne
 AmigaOne X1000
 Pegasos

References

External links
 Sam4x0 Home page
 ACube Systems Srl

Motherboard
PowerPC mainboards
Amiga